Transmembrane and coiled-coil domain-containing protein 1 is a protein that in humans is encoded by the TMCO1 gene.

References

Further reading